Karl Adolf Hack (15 June 1892 – 12 July 1954) was an Austrian long-distance runner. He competed in the marathon at the 1912 Summer Olympics.

References

1892 births
1954 deaths
Athletes (track and field) at the 1912 Summer Olympics
Austrian male long-distance runners
Austrian male marathon runners
Olympic athletes of Austria
Athletes from Vienna